Otha Leon Haywood (February 11, 1942 – April 5, 2016) was an American funk and soul singer, songwriter, and record producer.  He is best known for his 1975 hit single "I Want'a Do Something Freaky to You", which has been frequently sampled by musicians such as Dr. Dre (for his 1992 hit "Nuthin' but a 'G' Thang") among others.

Career
Born in Houston, he listened to the blues as a child and started playing piano at the age of three. In his teens, he performed with a local group and worked as an accompanist to blues musician, Guitar Slim.  In the early 1960s, he moved to Los Angeles, California, where he worked with saxophonist Big Jay McNeely.   McNeely arranged for him to record his first single, "Without a Love", an instrumental on the small Swingin' record label. After that, he joined Sam Cooke's band as keyboardist until the singer's death. Haywood next recorded two singles for Fantasy Records, and subsequently moved to Imperial Records, where he recorded the single "She's with Her Other Love", which made the R&B charts in 1965.

Haywood was also part of two session bands organized by Los Angeles disc jockey Magnificent Montague which issued the instrumental hits "Hole in the Wall" (R&B No. 5/Pop No. 50, 1965) under the name of the Packers, and "Precious Memories" (R&B number 31, 1967) billed as the Romeos. In 1967, Haywood secured his first solo hit with "It's Got to Be Mellow" (R&B No. 21 and Pop No. 63) on Decca Records. He played on further recording sessions with the Packers and Dyke & the Blazers, then returned to recording under his own name. He also established in 1967 a production company, Evejim, named after his parents.

Haywood recorded, without too much success for the Fat Fish (Hollywood, Ca.) label in 1966 and 1967. Two singles from that source were given a UK release at the time on the Decca distributed Vocalion label but gathered few sales – "Skate a While" and "Ain't No Use".

He found only sporadic success as a singer, including with "It's Got to Be Mellow" and "Keep It in the Family". After recording for Columbia Records, he moved over to MCA Records. He emerged as a star in the 1970s by modifying his style to incorporate the emerging funk and disco idioms. Haywood joined 20th Century Records in 1974 and was immediately successful, notably with "I Want'a Do Something Freaky to You" (R&B No. 7/Pop No. 15, 1975), "Strokin' (Pt. II)" (R&B No. 13, 1976) and "Party" (R&B No. 24, 1978). In 1980, Haywood revived the shuffle beat of 1950s rock and roll with "Don't Push It Don't Force It" (R&B No. 2 and Pop No. 49). This single also reached No. 12 in the UK Singles Chart, where he is considered a one-hit wonder.

Haywood is credited with writing the 1981 hit "She's a Bad Mama Jama" by Carl Carlton, which he produced in his own studio. In 1983, he released the album It's Me Again, which featured a couple minor R&B hits. His last R&B chart record was "Tenderoni" (No. 22) in 1984, but the accompanying album, Now and Then went unreleased (although the single was featured on a similarly-titled compilation album, Then & Now, which surfaced five years later). After a few more chart singles, for Casablanca Records and Modern Records, Haywood's output failed to excite the public's taste.  In the late 1980s, he became associated in an executive/production capacity with the Los Angeles-based Edge Records.  From the 1980s, he produced blues albums by Jimmy McCracklin, Clay Hammond, Ronnie Lovejoy, Buddy Ace and others on his own Evejim Records label.

He died in his sleep on April 5, 2016, aged 74.

Discography

Albums
 The Mellow Mellow Leon Haywood (Galaxy, 1964)
 Soul Cargo  (Fat Fish, 1966)	
 It's Got to Be Mellow (Decca, 1967)
 Back to Stay (20th Century, 1973)
 Keep It in the Family (20th Century, 1974)	
 Come and Get Yourself Some  (20th Century, 1975)	
 Intimate (Columbia, 1976)	
 Double My Pleasure (MCA, 1978) 	
 Energy (MCA, 1979) 	
 Naturally	 (20th Century, 1980)	
 It's Me Again  (Casablanca, 1983) 	
 Freaky Man  (Evejim, 1994)

Singles

References

External links
 

1942 births
2016 deaths
20th-century African-American male singers
African-American songwriters
American funk singers
American male singers
American soul singers
Musicians from Houston
Singers from Los Angeles
Songwriters from California
Songwriters from Texas
21st-century African-American people
American male songwriters